Galikash County is in Golestan province, Iran. The capital of the county is the city of Galikash. At the 2006 census, the region's population (as Galikash District of Minudasht County) was 57,404 in 13,706 households. The following census in 2011 counted 59,975 people in 16,384 households, by which time the district had been separated from the county to form Galikash County. At the 2016 census, the county's population was 63,173 in 18,721 households.

Administrative divisions

The population history and structural changes of Galikash County's administrative divisions over three consecutive censuses are shown in the following table. The latest census shows two districts, four rural districts, and one city.

References

 

Counties of Golestan Province